Winning 300 regular season games in the National Hockey League (NHL) is a rare and celebrated milestone for a goaltender. Thirty-nine goaltenders have reached this mark in NHL history; the first was Turk Broda of the Toronto Maple Leafs, who reached the milestone on December 20, 1950. The most recent was Craig Anderson of the Buffalo Sabres, who won his 300th game during the 2021–22 NHL season. Jacques Plante of the Montreal Canadiens was the fastest goaltender to reach the 300-win mark, achieving the milestone in his 528th game played.

Prominent goaltenders
Martin Brodeur is the all-time leader with 691 career regular season victories. He set the NHL record for wins on March 17, 2009, when he broke Patrick Roy's record of 551 wins. In reaching the 691 wins, Brodeur had eight seasons with at least 40 wins. No other goaltender has had more than three seasons with at least 40 wins. Brodeur credits his durability, noting he has been fortunate to avoid suffering any serious injuries during his career, while having the ability to play in excess of 70 games per season for 10 consecutive years.

Only sixteen goaltenders on this list have won at least 300 games on one team: Martin Brodeur (New Jersey Devils), Marc-Andre Fleury (Pittsburgh Penguins), Terry Sawchuk (Detroit Red Wings), Tony Esposito (Chicago Blackhawks), Chris Osgood (Detroit Red Wings), Miikka Kiprusoff (Calgary Flames), Billy Smith (New York Islanders), Olaf Kolzig (Washington Capitals), Jacques Plante (Montreal Canadiens) and only seven of those goaltenders on this list (Turk Broda (Toronto Maple Leafs), Mike Richter (New York Rangers), Pekka Rinne (Nashville Predators), Carey Price (Montreal Canadiens), Jonathan Quick (Los Angeles Kings), Tuukka Rask (Boston Bruins) and Henrik Lundqvist (New York Rangers) have played all their games with one team. Brodeur played his first 1,259 games for the New Jersey Devils and only his final seven games with the St. Louis Blues.

If one combines both their NHL and World Hockey Association (WHA) statistics, Gerry Cheevers (329), Mike Liut (325), and Bernie Parent (304) would have at least 300 wins as well.

Six goaltenders on this list remain active in the 2021–22 NHL season: Craig Anderson (BUF), Sergei Bobrovsky (FLA), Marc-Andre Fleury (MIN), Carey Price (MTL), Jonathan Quick (VGK), and Tuukka Rask (BOS).

Fourteen of the goaltenders on this list have been elected to the Hockey Hall of Fame, the most recent being 2018 inductee Martin Brodeur.

The 39 goaltenders who have 300 NHL wins consist of 22 Canadians, six Americans (Tom Barrasso, John Vanbiesbrouck, Mike Richter, Ryan Miller, Jonathan Quick and Craig Anderson), four Finns (Miikka Kiprusoff, Kari Lehtonen, Pekka Rinne, Tuukka Rask), three Russians (Sergei Bobrovsky, Nikolai Khabibulin, Evgeni Nabokov), two Czechs (Dominik Hasek, Tomas Vokoun), one German (Olaf Kolzig), and one Swede (Henrik Lundqvist).

According to Brent Sutter, who coached Brodeur and Kiprusoff, and played with Ed Belfour and Billy Smith, goaltenders who reach 300 wins are all highly competitive athletes: "They were guys that every game, you knew you could count on them."

Key

List of goaltenders

See also
 List of NHL statistical leaders

References

300 wins, goaltender